Fengtai (mostly ) may refer to:

Fengtai District, Beijing
Beijing Fengtai railway station, station currently under renovation in the district
Fengtai Subdistrict, subdivision of Fengtai District
Fengtai County, Huainan, Anhui
, town in and subdivision of Ninghe District, Tianjin
, town in and subdivision of Jingchuan County, Gansu